Anders Hagelskjær (born 16 February 1997) is a Danish professional footballer who plays for Molde.

References

Living people
1997 births
Danish men's footballers
Danish expatriate men's footballers
Association football defenders
People from Faaborg-Midtfyn Municipality
Sportspeople from the Region of Southern Denmark
FC Midtjylland players
Skive IK players
Silkeborg IF players
AaB Fodbold players
Sarpsborg 08 FF players
Molde FK players
Danish Superliga players
Danish 1st Division players
Danish expatriate sportspeople in Norway
Expatriate footballers in Norway